1915 is a 2015 American psychological thriller film written and directed by Garin Hovannisian and Alec Mouhibian. The film stars Simon Abkarian, Angela Sarafyan, Nikolai Kinski, Debra Christofferson, Jim Piddock, and Samuel Page. It follows a mysterious director staging a play to bring the ghosts of a forgotten tragedy back to life on the 100th anniversary of the Armenian genocide.

The film was released in theaters on April 17, 2015 and through video on demand on April 22, 2015.

Plot 
Exactly 100 years after the Armenian genocide committed within Ottoman Empire, a director (Simon Abkarian) is staging a play at the historic Los Angeles Theatre to honor the victims of the massacre. The play stars his enigmatic wife (Angela Sarafyan) as an Armenian woman in 1915 who must make a tragic and controversial decision that will change the course of history. This will not be an ordinary performance. As protesters surround the theater before showtime, and a series of strange accidents spread panic among its actors (Sam Page, Nikolai Kinski) and producer (Jim Piddock), it appears that Simon's mission is far more dangerous than we think—and the ghosts of the past are everywhere.

Themes
The film explores many themes, especially that of denial—referring not only to the 100-year denial of the Armenian Genocide by the Republic of Turkey, but also the many forms of individual denial among the characters in the story.

Critic Martin Tsai, in his Los Angeles Times review, identified 1915 as contemplating "personal tragedy versus collective grief, artistic license versus historical responsibility, revisionist history versus corrective narrative, forgetting versus moving on," and praised the film as "one creative way to do justice to such a monumental topic."

In an interview, co-writer/director Alec Mouhibian said, "How can the past have such power over us in the present, and what are the secret ways in which we deal with it? The target of 1915 is you, the viewer, whoever you are, whatever your background. Everyone who steps into the mystery will experience it in one's own way. We hope you come out of it with a richer connection to your past -- a new way of feeling history."

Production 
1915 is the first feature film by Garin Hovannisian and Alec Mouhibian. Hovannisian is the author of Family of Shadows and has written for the Los Angeles Times, The New York Times, and other publications. Mouhibian is a writer and comedian whose work has appeared in Slate, The Weekly Standard, and a variety of other publications. He has also been a Media Fellow of the Hoover Institution at Stanford University.

Hovannisian and Mouhibian have been collaborating on film and literary projects for more than ten years.

The film was produced by Bloodvine Media, in conjunction with Strongman and  Media.

Location 
Filming took place almost entirely on location at the historic Los Angeles Theatre, in downtown LA. Long believed to be haunted, the theater is its own character in the story, and the deleted scenes include references to one of its founders, Charlie Chaplin.

Cast
 Simon Abkarian as Simon
 Angela Sarafyan as Angela
 Samuel Page as James
 Jim Piddock as Jeffrey
 Nikolai Kinski as Tony
 Debra Christofferson as Lillian
 Sunny Suljic as Gabriel
 Courtney Halverson as Lucky
 Myles Cranford as Ray
 Linc Hand as Police Officer
 Mercy Malick as Radio Announcer
 Robert Hallak as Armenian Protest Leader
 David Imani as Turkish Protest Leader
 Lory Tatoulian as Armenian Protester

Music
The original score of the film was composed by System of a Down's lead singer, Serj Tankian. It is his first film score.

Release 
The theatrical release of 1915 in the United States took place on April 17, 2015, with the film's premiere taking place on April 13 at the Egyptian Theatre in conjunction with the American Cinematheque. It released widely in Russia on April 23, 2015, and in Armenia on April 25, 2015. Its first international preview was at the Maxim Gorky Theatre in Berlin, Germany on April 5, 2015. It released in Australia in June, 2015.

On May 26, 2016, the film was released in the UK. On June 4 it was released in France.

In 2015 it was featured selection in the Golden Apricot International Film Festival, Romanian International Film Festival, and Lake Van International Film Festival in Turkey, where it won the Special Jury Prize. It was also awarded "Best Film" by the World Entertainment Armenian Awards.

See also
 1915 in film

References

External links

 
 
 

2015 films
2015 psychological thriller films
2010s mystery drama films
2010s mystery thriller films
American mystery drama films
American mystery thriller films
American psychological thriller films
Armenian genocide films
Films about theatre
Films set in a theatre
Films set in Los Angeles
Films shot in Los Angeles
2010s English-language films
2010s American films